Kristen Lynne Soltis Anderson is a Republican pollster, television personality, and writer whose work has appeared in The Daily Beast, Politico, and HuffPost.

In 2013 Time named Anderson one of the 30 People Under 30 who are changing the world. Marie Claire declared Anderson one of the "New Guard" of fifty rising female leaders.

Early life and education
Kristen Lynne Soltis grew up in Orlando, Florida. She graduated from the University of Florida with a B.A. in political science in 2005; she obtained her M.A. in government from Johns Hopkins University in 2009. As a junior in college, she interned with the finance department of the National Republican Congressional Committee and was appointed by Florida Governor Jeb Bush to the Florida Commemorative Quarter Committee. As a senior, she interned at The Winston Group, an opinion research and political communications firm based in Washington, D.C.

Career
After graduation in 2005, she accepted a full-time position with The Winston Group, where she focused on the youth vote and education reform. After earning her graduate degree in 2009, she published excerpts from her thesis as articles on Pollster.com and conservative blog The Next Right. In 2010, her findings were mentioned by Democratic political strategist and commentator James Carville, leading to appearances on television news shows as a guest commentator and political pundit. She received one million dollars from a Republican super PAC to research the youth vote and served as its communications director.

During the 2012 elections, she was a communications adviser to Crossroads Generation, a Republican organization focused on the youth vote. After Mitt Romney lost the 2012 youth vote, she co-developed a guidebook outlining strategies for the Republican Party to garner more votes from young people. In 2014, she made the National Journals annual Women of Washington list of the 25 most influential Washington women under 35.

In 2014, she left The Winston Group and founded research organization Echelon Insights with Patrick Ruffini. In 2015, she published The Selfie Vote: Where Millennials are Leading America (and How Republicans Can Keep Up).

Anderson has cohosted two live media blogs: The Week In Blog for Bloggingheads.tv and Wilshire and Washington for Variety. She served as an issue-advocacy adviser to the YG Network in support of its efforts to develop conservative women activists. She co-hosts a podcast called The Pollsters.

Works

Personal life
Kristen and Chris Anderson were married on April 28, 2012. They have a daughter named Eliana Christine Anderson, born in June, 2022.

Soltis Anderson has a golden retriever named Wallace ("Wally").

References

External links

 Jonathan Miller (Kentucky politician), Kristen Soltis’ Bio The Recovering Politician

Living people
American political writers
American women television personalities
Pollsters
American political commentators
1984 births
Writers from Orlando, Florida
University of Florida alumni
Johns Hopkins University alumni
Washington, D.C., Republicans
Television personalities from Florida